"Rock the Boat" is a song recorded by American singer Aaliyah for her eponymous third and final studio album (2001). It was written by Static Major, Eric Seats and Rapture Stewart, while Seats and Stewart handled its production. A mid-tempo R&B song, "Rock the Boat" features a female narrator instructing her lover on how to sexually please her.

Despite Aaliyah initially starting promotion for the expected second single "More Than a Woman", Blackground Records and Virgin Records serviced "Rock the Boat" to rhythmic contemporary radio as the second single from Aaliyah in the United States on August 21, 2001, while "More Than a Woman" was released as the second international single.

Upon its release, "Rock the Boat" received widespread critical acclaim. A commercial success, it peaked at number 14 on the US Billboard Hot 100. Internationally, the song reached the top ten in the Netherlands, and the top 20 in the United Kingdom. At the 44th Annual Grammy Awards (2002), "Rock the Boat" was nominated for Best Female R&B Vocal Performance.

The accompanying music video for "Rock the Boat" was directed by Hype Williams and was filmed in Miami and the Bahamas. Following its completion, Aaliyah and eight others died in a plane crash on August 25, 2001. Posthumously released, the video received critical acclaim and was nominated for Best R&B Video at the 2002 MTV Video Music Awards.

Writing and production
"Rock the Boat" was written by Static Major, Eric Seats and Rapture Stewart, while its production was handled by Seats and Stewart. It came into fruition almost by accident due to Seats almost deleting the song's file, since he wasn't satisfied with it at first. He explained: "I almost deleted 'Rock The Boat' because I'm the kind of guy that once I start producing a track and I don't feel it right away sometimes, I would delete it and just start something over fresh." The song was saved when Static Major heard its instrumental and quickly wrote the hook.
According to Seats, "Static heard it through my headphones. I took a break and went to the restroom, and by the time I got back he had already written a hook."

Discussing the fate of the song, he proceeded to say: "I wouldn't say it was an accident, but we weren't vibing with it as much. It was one of those things like if he had came 10 minutes later, he probably would've never heard it." The song was "very raw" during its early stages, and since Major showed strong interest, Seats continued to develop it. Seats mentioned: "Since he had an interest in it, I said, 'Let me go and continue building on it, let me embellish it, make something happen since you're feeling it.' We didn't know it was going to end up being 'Rock The Boat'." Seats "beefed" up the development process of the track by calling Dave Foreman and Rapture Stewart to add a guitar and strings to the instrumental.

Music and lyrics

"Rock the Boat" was described as being a Caribbean-flavored sensual and smooth mid-tempo song, that features 1970s funk influences. Meanwhile, Jeff Lorez from Yahoo! Music states that it has a retro jazziness feel. On the song Aaliyah is "reveling in her sexual freedom for the first time on record". Production wise it features an atmospheric groove, hypnotic rhythms, and fluctuating instrumentation, such as synthesizer effects. Michael Odell from The Guardian felt that "Rock the Boat" pays tribute to synth-driven 1980s soul.

"Aaliyah's tentative vocal finds its way around a menu of high-octane sexual requests". She "breathlessly purrs sexual commands over an airy groove whose instrumentation swells against and then falls away from her voice". Lyrically, its female narrator instructs a lover on how to please her sexually and equates her erotic high to a drug high. Natelegé Whaley of Mic opined that "she is captain of her physical needs in the bedroom and confidently directs the voyage. She knew what she wanted and knew how to get it." According to producer Bud'da, Aaliyah debated about the song including the line "I feel like I'm on dope" because she didn't want to send a wrong message to her fans.

Release
Having invested in the commercial performance of Aaliyah, Blackground Records and Virgin Records wanted a single with a high chart peak to help increase the album's sales. Its lead single "We Need a Resolution" had been released on April 13, 2001, but underperformed on radio and reached only number 59 on the US  Billboard Hot 100. Originally, "More Than a Woman" was chosen as the second single from Aaliyah. According to producer Rapture Stewart, "The only reason they shot 'Rock the Boat' was because the radio was already playing it, so that kind of forced it to be the second single."

Despite its radio success, Blackground didn't want "Rock the Boat" to be released as a single, instead campaigning for Timbaland-produced songs, including "More Than a Woman". Aaliyah fought with the label and pushed for "Rock the Boat" to become the second single; producer Eric Seats recalled hearing her say: "No, it's this one. I don't care who did what. This one is the next one." Consequently, Blackground and Virgin serviced "Rock the Boat" to rhythmic contemporary radio in the United States as the second single from Aaliyah on August 21, 2001. In Australia, it was released as the third and final single on November 26. The single was released in mainland Europe in April 2002 and the UK in May 2002.

In August 2021, it was reported that Aaliyah's recorded work for Blackground (since rebranded as Blackground Records 2.0) would be re-released on physical, digital, and, for the first time ever, streaming services in a deal between the label and Empire Distribution. Aaliyah, including "Rock the Boat", was re-released on September 10.

Critical reception
Khal from Complex described the accompanying music video for "Rock the Boat" as "a thing of beauty, with tropical visuals properly matching the laid back vibe of the instrumental. Perfect percussive accents dwell around the chilled melodies." James Poletti from dotmusic felt that Aaliyah's "breathy vocals become stutteringly suggestive as the track squelches and pops its way to a rather lovely place." Connie Johnson from the Los Angeles Times described "Rock the Boat" as being "sexily assertive"; she also felt that the song, along with "We Need a Resolution", was a standout song on the album.

Michael Hubbard from MusicOMH gave the song a mixed review, although he felt this song wasn't "the best record she's done", he praised her vocals, saying "Aaliyah shows again that one needn't screech a la Miss Mariah Carey in order to achieve pleasing results". John Robinson from NME panned the song calling it "one of the less memorable tracks from her album".
He also thought it was "Overproduced to the point where the song skids past you on a trail of its own slickness". Ernest Hardy from Rolling Stone, said "Rock the Boat" was the highlight of the album, and felt that the song showed Aaliyah coming "into her own as a woman". Overall, Hardy declared, "She's at the wheel, steering her sexuality and using it to explore her own fantasies and strengths. And the joy you hear in her voice, in the grooves, is rooted in independence. R&B;'s reigning ice princess is starting to thaw."

Russell Baillie from The New Zealand Herald described the song as "boudoir-instructional" and felt that "Aaliyah's voice weaves through the sparse but punchy arrangements with a mix of sultriness". Brad Cawn from the Chicago Tribune felt that Aaliyah had matured and was "growing into seductive escapades" on "Rock the Boat". Sal Cinquemani from Slant Magazine compared the song to the work of Janet Jackson and Marvin Gaye; he ultimately felt that Aaliyah did "80's retro" songs better than other artists. In a retrospective review, Billboard felt that due to issues surrounding  “Rock the Boat”, that it "will always carry near-mythical significance". Ultimately, the "song crystallizes the things we loved, and continue to love, about Aaliyah: Her angelic vocals, her seductive delivery, her aura of strength and sexual liberation and (thanks to the video) her innate talent as a dancer, all layered over a sleek, infectious beat that seems to loop forever".

Accolades

Commercial performance
In the United States, "Rock the Boat" debuted at number 57 on the Billboard Hot 100 on September 8, 2001. It peaked at number 14 in its 12th week, spending a total of 25 weeks on the chart. The song peaked at number two on the Hot R&B/Hip-Hop Songs on November 24. On the Rhythmic chart, the song peaked at number 13 in its 19th week, on January 12, 2002.

In the United Kingdom, "Rock the Boat" debuted and peaked at number 12 on the UK Singles Chart and number four on the UK R&B Chart. In Scotland, the song debuted and peaked at number 32 on May 12, 2002. According to the Official Charts Company (OCC), "Rock the Boat" is Aaliyah's fourth best-selling single in the UK. In Belgium, the song peaked at number nine on the Ultratip chart in Wallonia on April 4. In the Netherlands, it peaked at number nine on the Dutch Top 40, and at number 12 on the Single Top 100, both on March 16.

Music video

Background and production
Preparation for shooting “Rock the Boat” began weeks in advance, with director Hype Williams contacting Aaliyah's stylist and choreographer "separately to discuss his vision for the video". According to Aaliyah's former choreographer Fatima Robinson, "The whole concept was Hype’s ,The song has such a wonderful, sensual, sexual vibe to it, and we wanted to play along with that. The beautiful beach, the idea of dancing on the yacht, were all Hype’s idea. We just wanted to have this really beautiful, classy, elegant video.” Speaking about the filming locations, Derek Lee Aaliyah's former stylist stated, "He said, we’re shooting here, here, and here, and that’s all, Back then, when you worked with an artist all the time, directors didn’t really say too much. They were just like, do what you do. Make sure it works within the framework.” On August 21, 2001, Aaliyah appearered on BET's 106 & Park, and announced that the accompanying music video for "Rock the Boat" was to be directed by Hype Williams and that filming would begin the following day.

The video's dance routine was choreographed by Aaliyah's close friend Fatima Robinson and dancers in the video included Carmit Bachar, Denosh Bennett, Nadine Ellis and Electrik Red members Binkie and Lesley. There wasn't a lot of time to rehearse choreography and they rehearsed three days before production began in a Miami dance studio. Robinson stated, "We only did a few days, it wasn’t long at all, But [Aaliyah] was an amazing dancer, and caught on really fast. Sometimes, she felt like she couldn’t get it, but I would push her a little harder, [and say,] ‘You got this.” Recalling her experience with Aaliyah Ellis said, “Aaliyah was there for all the rehearsals, “She came in and learned along with us, hung out with us, and was very, very cool. That’s the memory of her that stands out for me. There have been artists who, when they don’t have to be around the dancers, will step into another room or will get there with just enough time to learn the choreography and move on with their day. But she really wanted to be there. It just reminded me how much of a girl she still was.”

On August 22, she filmed both the underwater and green screen scenes for the video in Miami, Florida. Ellis, "had been cast as Aaliyah’s “mirror” for the green screen portion—a dance partner who reflected Aaliyah's “hip swivels".  The idea for the mirror dance moves "stemmed from Robinson’s natural meshing with Aaliyah when they danced together, which she likened to synchronized swimming." After filming the green screen portion, "the crew decamped for a hotel swimming pool", where Aaliyah was filmed underwater. The following day, Aaliyah and employees of Virgin Records America flew to the Bahamas on two flights using a Fairchild Metro III, chartered through Sky Limo. Nearly 60 people worked on the video in the Bahamas. Upon her Arrival to the Bahamas, Aaliyah began filming very early on the beach by 6:30 AM on August 24.

On the final shoot day, Aaliyah and her dancers filmed the yacht portion of the video. "The dancers loaded onto the catamaran in the morning, then changed into their all-white costumes to film choreography", which differed from the look and feel of the green screen dance moves. “Miami was really technical, because you had to be within certain parameters, making sure you were on your mark and that all the spacing was right,” But when we got to The Bahamas, it was definitely more of a free space. We just got to flow", says Ellis. Aaliyah was scheduled to leave the Bahamas on August 26, but chose to leave the day before since she had finished early. Williams recalled: "Aaliyah left mid-production, so we were still shooting when she left". When discussing working with Aaliyah on the video, Williams stated: "Those four days were very beautiful for everyone. We all worked together as a family." Williams said that the camaraderie on the set was a refreshing change from the usual shoot, adding: "The last day, Saturday, was one of the best I've had in this business. Everyone felt part of something special, part of her song."

Due to the tragedy surrounding Aaliyah's death, there was an uncertainty about the release date for the video. In a press release, a spokesperson for Blackground Records said it was too soon to say what would become of the footage. The music video made its world premiere on BET's Access Granted on October 9, 2001. BET producer Kevin Taylor, who was in the Bahamas filming the video, described it as "gorgeous and sensual".

Fashion
Speaking about the fashion aspect of the video, Lee stated "Rock the Boat wasn’t a fashion video per se, It was more to showcase a softer side of her, Yes Aaliyah had to be the superstar girl, but she also had to be relatable". He continued, "Nothing could look styled—it had to be achievable and doable by young girls". In the video, Aaliyah wore various outfits, including a tie-dye skirt, which was fabric her stylist Derek Lee bought on Fifth Avenue and simply tied together, with an orange crop top he purchased at Patricia Field's shop in the East Village. Lee was also heavily influenced by Jamaican dancehall culture for an all-red outfit, whose accessories were all custom-made, with Lee stating: "In Jamaica, people were using what they had around them to make things, so we took a Coca-Cola can, we cut it up, made the band around the top and around the Kangol hat. We even made some earrings that were little Coke bottles." For the underwater scenes, Williams suggested that Aaliyah wore an outfit with a lot of fabric "so it can seem like she's floating", so Lee styled her in a swimsuit designed by Norma Kamali and added extra fabric to elongate it.

Synopsis
The music video for "Rock the Boat" begins with Aaliyah on the beach with her back to the ocean. She is wearing a red top, dangling hoop earrings and shimmering gold eye shadow as she sings the slyly suggestive lyrics of "Rock the Boat". The next scene features Aaliyah dancing on a catamaran, on a beach in Marsh Harbour and swimming underwater in the ocean. Other scenes include Aaliyah dancing in computer-generated tide waves. When describing the video's recurring theme, BET producer Kevin Taylor mentioned: "It's very ethereal and heavenly." He also stated: "There are lots of shots of water and clouds, and the video ends with Aaliyah swimming up from the bottom of a pool, almost looking like she's going into the clouds. It's really beautiful."

Reception
The video was ranked at number 93 on Billboards list "100 Greatest Music Videos of the 21st Century". Rebecca Milzoff from Billboard praised the video, saying: "The video for Aaliyah's sinuous 'Rock the Boat' might have easily gone down as just one of the many examples of the beloved singer's preternatural cool and low-key sex appeal, featuring Aaliyah leading an all-female ensemble in understatedly sexy moves mirroring the song's hypnotic, undulating melody." Maxine Wally from W, felt that the video was fairly simple and that the best parts "comes at the very end, and is just as unadorned. Aaliyah, in what appears to be a candid moment, laughs widely as she looks to her left, like someone off-camera just did something charming and hilarious. In my eyes, it is the perfect way to cap off her final creation. It’s a reminder that although Aaliyah isn’t around today, her legacy remains".

Aaliyah's death

On Saturday, August 25, 2001, after Aaliyah and the record company employees had completed filming the music video for "Rock the Boat", at 6:50 p.m. (EDT), they boarded a twin-engine Cessna 402B (registration N8097W) at the Marsh Harbour Airport, located on the Abaco Islands, for the return trip back to Opa-locka Airport in Florida. The return flight was originally booked for the following day, but filming had finished early, and Aaliyah and her entourage were eager to return to the United States. They made the decision to leave immediately. The aircraft designated for the return flight was smaller than the one on which they had originally arrived, but it accommodated the whole party and all of their equipment.

The passengers had grown impatient because the plane was supposed to arrive at 4:30 p.m. EDT, but did not arrive until 6:15 p.m. EDT. Charter pilot Lewis Key claimed to have overheard passengers arguing with fellow pilot Luis Morales III prior to take off, adding that Morales warned them that there was too much weight for a "safe flight". Key further stated: "He tried to convince them the plane was overloaded, but they insisted they had chartered the plane and they had to be in Miami Saturday night." Key indicated that Morales gave in to the passengers and that he had trouble starting one of the engines.

Aaliyah and eight others on board–Morales, hair stylist Eric Foreman, Anthony Dodd, security guard Scott Gallin, family friend Keith Wallace, make-up artist Christopher Maldonado, and Blackground Records employees Douglas Kratz and Gina Smith–were all killed. Gallin survived the initial impact and, according to paramedics, spent his last moments worrying about Aaliyah's condition. Kathleen Bergen, spokeswoman for the U.S. Federal Aviation Administration (FAA) in Atlanta, identified the aircraft as being owned by Florida-based company Skystream. Initial crash reports identified Luis Morales as "L Marael".

Key suggested that engine failure, along with overloading of the aircraft, could have caused the crash, recalling that others had seen the plane experience an engine failure on takeoff. One witness believed that no one could have survived the accident because of the crash intensity and the fact that the aircraft had disintegrated upon impact. He also recalled the condition of the bodies: "It was an awful sight. Some bodies were so badly disfigured, you couldn't identify them. And two guys were alive — one screaming and screaming for help. He was horribly burned all over." A 25-year-old charter pilot who witnessed the crash saw the Cessna go down as he was working on some machinery "about half a mile" away. He recalled the aircraft being only "60 to 100 feet" off the ground before it crashed. He went to get a fire truck and was stunned by what he saw upon arriving at the crash site. "I've seen crashes before but that was probably one of the worst ones," he said. "It was pretty devastating. The aircraft was broken into pieces and some of the seats were thrown from the aircraft."

Legacy
"Rock the Boat" has been covered and sampled by numerous recording artists. American singer and actor Colton Ford covered the song for his second studio album Under the Covers (2009), while American singer JoJo performed it on several of her concerts. Aaliyah was credited as a featured artist, alongside Ne-Yo, on American rapper Rick Ross' 2010 song "She Crazy", which sampled "Rock the Boat". Excerpts of Aaliyah singing on "Rock the Boat" were used on Canadian singer The Weeknd's song "What You Need" from his debut mixtape House of Balloons (2011), and American rapper T.I.'s 2016 song "Dope", featuring Marsha Ambrosius. American rapper Kanye West lyrically interpolated "Rock the Boat" in the song "Fade" from his seventh studio album The Life of Pablo (2016).

Track listings and formatsEuropean CD single"Rock the Boat" (album version) – 4:34
"Rock the Boat" (instrumental) – 4:34European maxi CD single"Rock the Boat" (album version) – 4:34
"Rock the Boat" (club mix by Mixzo) – 5:18
"Rock the Boat" (club mix by Doug Lazy) – 4:20
"Rock the Boat" (music video) – 5:27European 12-inch vinyl"Rock the Boat" (album version) – 4:34
"Rock the Boat" (instrumental) – 4:34
"Rock the Boat" (club mix by Mixzo) – 5:18
"Rock the Boat" (club mix by Doug Lazy) – 4:20UK cassette single"Rock the Boat" (radio edit) – 3:37
"Rock the Boat" (club mix by Mixzo) – 5:18
"Rock the Boat" (club mix by Doug Lazy) – 4:20French CD single"Rock the Boat" (album version) – 4:34
"Rock the Boat" (club mix by Mixzo) – 5:18Australian maxi CD single'''
"Rock the Boat" (album version) – 4:34
"Rock the Boat" (club mix) – 5:16
"We Need a Resolution" (featuring Timbaland) – 4:02

Credits and personnel
Credits are adapted from the liner notes of Aaliyah''.
 Aaliyah – vocals
 Chandler Bridges – engineering assistance
 Ben Garrison – mixing
 Acar Keys – engineering
 Eric Seats – instrumentation, production, writing
 Static Major – writing
 Rapture Stewart – instrumentation, production, writing

Charts

Weekly charts

Year-end charts

Release history

References

Bibliography

External links
 
 
 Official website

2001 songs
Aaliyah songs
Music videos directed by Hype Williams
Songs written by Static Major
2002 singles
2001 singles